The Journal of Advertising is published fives times per year and is a peer-reviewed academic journal covering advertising theories and their relationship with practice. It is owned by the American Academy of Advertising and published on their behalf by Routledge Taylor & Francis.

Abstracting and indexing 
The journal is abstracted and indexed in Communication Abstracts, Current Contents/Social and Behavioral Sciences, Emerald Management Reviews, International Bibliography of the Social Sciences, PsycINFO, ProQuest, Scopus, and Social Sciences Citation Index. According to the Journal Citation Reports, the Journal has a 2019 impact factor of 6.302.

Editors 
The following persons have been editors-in-chief of the journal:

As of January 2020, the editor-in-chief is Shelly Rodgers (University of Missouri)

References

External links 
 
 American Academy of Advertising

Business and management journals
Quarterly journals
Publications established in 1972
English-language journals
Routledge academic journals